The Asian Reporter is a Pacific Northwest-based newspaper, published monthly, in Portland, Oregon, United States. The paper was founded in 1991 and features international and local Northwest news and events with an Asian focus. The newspaper is published on the first Monday each month.

The website enhances the publication by presenting some of the same in-depth articles while providing additional resources and information.

External links
 The Asian Reporter

1991 establishments in Oregon
Asian-American culture in Portland, Oregon
Newspapers published in Portland, Oregon
Publications established in 1991
Weekly newspapers published in the United States